Benoit Groulx may refer to:

Benoit Groulx (Canadian football) (born 1985), Canadian football quarterback 
Benoit Groulx (ice hockey) (born 1968), Canadian ice hockey player and coach

See also
Benoit-Olivier Groulx, Canadian professional ice hockey player